Shureh-ye Pain may refer to:
 Shureh-ye Pain, Ashtian